Old Cash Dawgs, more popularly known by the shortened term O.C. Dawgs, is a Filipino hip hop trio consisting of Skusta Clee, Bullet D, and Jnske that was formed in 2012. The collective is known for their numerous hit singles "Pauwi Nako", "Akala Ko Nung Una", "Kriminal", and "Hayaan Mo Sila", the collaborative trap track with Ex Battalion in 2017 that almost topped the now-defunct Billboard Philippines Top 20 chart.

History and career
Old Cash Dawgs was formed and founded in 2012 by Skusta Clee, who mostly writes the song hooks, followed by Bullet D and Jnske. Skusta Clee, the lead member of O.C. Dawgs, pioneered the Pinoy trap genre, which helped launch the country's mainstream trap movement. Despite being underground at first, O.C. Dawgs dominated Musical.ly in 2016 with the release of "Kriminal", the same year the group joined Ex Battalion.

On September 18, 2017, "Hayaan Mo Sila", their collaboration with Ex Battalion, debuted on the Billboard Philippines Top 20 chart. In their 16th week on the chart, they peaked at #2. On June 18, 2018, their performance of that song on the "Wish Bus" of Wish 107.5 was uploaded to Youtube. Two days later, it had topped YouTube PH’s trends list.

The O.C. Dawgs have seen phenomenal success with "Pauwi Nako", which was released in 2018 under the Panty Droppaz League music label, and has amassed millions of streams on both Spotify and YouTube platforms. Their performance of that song on the "Wish Bus" ranked third on YouTube PH's top trending music videos for 2019. It was the fastest video from their channel to hit 10 million YouTube views in no less than two weeks.

Controversies

Plagiarism 
Ex Battalion members Skusta Clee and Flow G have been accused of plagiarism for releasing a promotional track entitled "Deym" identical to "Ddaeng" by BTS in September 2020. The contentious piece sparked heated debate, making #SkustaCleeisGoingtoJailParty a trending topic on Philippine Twitter. A few weeks later, the group's management denied allegations claiming that the two pieces are 'inherently different' and that they used a generic triplet flow. The management also added that "parallel thinking among artists do happen and it cannot be avoided".

Members
 Skusta Clee – leader, vocalist, rapper
 Bullet D – rapper
 Jnske – rapper

Discography

Singles

As lead artist

As featured artist

Awards and nominations

See also
 Filipino hip hop

Notes

References

Filipino hip hop groups
Filipino rappers
Hip hop collectives
Musical groups established in 2016